Hapıtlı (also, Gapytly and Khapytly) is a village in the Agdash Rayon of Azerbaijan. The village forms part of the municipality of Aşağı Ləki.

References 

Populated places in Agdash District